The Mount Tamalpais & Muir Woods Railway was a scenic tourist railway operating between Mill Valley and the east peak of Mount Tamalpais in Marin County, California, covering a distance of , with a  spur line to the Muir Woods. The railroad was incorporated in January 1896, and closed in the summer of 1930. Originally planned as a  electric trolley line, the railroad was powered by a succession of geared steam locomotives. Billed as the "Crookedest Railroad in the World," the line was renowned for its steep and serpentine route, winding through picturesque terrain to a mountaintop tavern providing first-class hospitality and panoramic views of the San Francisco Bay Area. Despite its popularity, the railway met its demise following a fire in 1929, and dwindling ridership when the automobile could finally drive to Tamalpais' summit.

Origin

Mount Tamalpais

Mount Tamalpais's peaks rise over the redwood-shaded canyons and rugged grass-covered hills of Marin. During the late 19th Century, Marin County was regarded more as a source of lumber than as place of natural beauty and respite from the densely populated areas just south across the San Francisco Bay.

Mill Valley, located at the base of Mount Tamalpais, was first planned in the late 1880s and incorporated in 1900. The city was named for a sawmill built by John Reed, to cut lumber harvested from the surrounding area. Once the area was logged, the land was divided into parcels and sold as home sites, which at first were primarily vacation residences. The city was served by The Sausalito Land and Ferry Company and the North Pacific Coast Railroad. These provided access to Mill Valley, requiring a short ferry ride across the Bay from San Francisco to Sausalito, then a transfer to the railroad for another brief trip that terminated in Mill Valley. Mount Tamalpais lies only  directly north of San Francisco and  directly east of the Pacific Ocean.

Due to ease of access provided by the ferry and rail service, entrepreneurs realized the potential for transforming the undeveloped hills north of San Francisco into a recreational destination. Sidney B. Cushing was one such individual. He had recently acquired the Blithedale Hotel summer resort just north of downtown Mill Valley in Corte Madera Canyon. The hills surrounding Mill Valley were steep—requiring a dependable means of transportation for them to become a vacation spot. Rail was the most logical means at the time, and Mount Tamalpais was the most attractive destination for such a line.

Formation and construction of the railroad
 

Louis L. Janes was the initial impetus behind creating a railroad at Mount Tamalpais. Janes was the resident director of the Tamalpais Land & Water Co. and first town clerk of Mill Valley. Sidney B. Cushing, president of the San Rafael Gas & Electric Co., was chosen as President of the corporation. It was initially named the Mill Valley and Mount Tamalpais Scenic Railway due to the fact the Muir Woods branch had not yet been planned. Funding came from several sources, provided to the corporation in exchange for stock in the company. One influential resident, A. E. Kent, gave the corporation right-of-way through his property in Corte Madera Canyon in exchange for $10,000 in stock. A. E. Kent and his son, William, were early Marin residents who foresaw the region's appeal to visitors from the Bay Area and beyond. William Kent was a Progressive Republican Congressman representing California from 1911–1917. Considering his family's financial interests in the railway, Kent spearheaded the movement to form the Muir Woods National Monument, a popular destination on the line.

Construction began on February 5, 1896. Originating at the North Pacific Coast Railroad depot in Mill Valley, the line was planned to ascend the surrounding hills to the summit of Mount Tamalpais, then over the top of the peak and down to Bolinas Beach. The pristine beach was difficult to access, and residents supported the line's planned arrival. This remained only a plan, as did the initial proposal to make the line an electric trolley route. A wagon road was constructed to Willow Camp (Stinson Beach) in 1902 and electric power never supplanted the geared steam locomotives used to construct the line. Supplies and laborers arrived in Mill Valley and began work by February 1896. Over 200 men, an international mix of laborers, graded the route and laid rails. Many left their jobs in protest over poor pay and expensive board—$1.75 a day for 10 hours of work followed by a night at an obligatory boarding house costing $5.25 a week. Despite these labor concerns and some local enmity from residents who opposed noisy locomotives running adjacent to their property, construction ensued. Within six months, the railroad construction was completed at a cost of $55,000; equipment cost an additional $80,000. The last spike was driven on August 18, 1896, with the first passenger train operating just four days later.

Operation

Route

This building took several forms through the years, significantly more grandiose and Victorian than the current mission-style depot, today a bookstore and cafe. Trains headed north, across Throckmorton, between two buildings, behind the Masonic Hall and past a water tank and shed at Lovell Avenue. The tracks crossed Corte Madera Avenue and passed the maintenance shop (engine house) at Alcatraz Place. From the depot to King Street, the grade paralleled the Arroyo Corte Madera del Presidio stream that twists through Mill Valley between Blithedale and Corte Madera Avenues. At Lee Street the tracks passed a small station and water tank before continuing another ¾ of a mile to Horse Shoe Curve, where the tracks crossed the stream one final time and headed southwest to Milepost Two. Continuing to head southwest, the tracks curved almost a dozen more times before reaching Milepost Three. 

Fern Canyon Drive currently follows this section of the old roadbed, including a tight curve at Summit Avenue, followed by numerous curves until reaching Milepost Four, lying just beyond a large home currently located at the end of Fern Canyon Road. From Milepost Four, the roadbed loops around the home and becomes a fire road available to hikers who, from this point, can follow the roadbed to its terminus at the peak.

Within these curves was Mesa Station, a small depot, a siding and water tanks for the steam engines. Just above Mesa was the longest straightaway on the line:. A branch from mainline was added at Mesa Junction and headed southwest for Muir Woods, known as Redwood Canyon when it opened in 1907. The first tourists to Muir Woods came on the scenic railway.

Heisler locomotive No. 2 wrecked about ¼ of a mile before Milepost Five on August 22, 1900, killing the engineer, Ernest Thomas. Grease deposits on the rail caused the locomotive to jump the rails and topple down the slope on the south side of the tracks, damaging the locomotive and releasing steam that fatally scalded Ernest Thomas.

A half mile from Boot Jack the tracks finished their westward climb at the West Point Inn.

Curvature

In order to follow a route that steam locomotives could ascend, the track had to maintain a grade that was not excessive. The entire line's average grade was 5%, comprising maximum grades of 7% at some points on the line. As the crow flies, the peak of Mount Tamalpais is only a few miles from Mill Valley. However, a direct approach presented an impracticably steep ascent for the railroad. Thus, it meandered  up the mountain, cutting its way back and forth across the terrain. According to an article entitled "Geared Locomotives on the Mount Tamalpais Railway" from the July 16, 1898 edition of Scientific American, the mainline had only  of straight track, with the remainder composed of the following 266 curves:
26 curves of  radius, [amounting to a total distance of] 
24 curves of  radius, 
20 curves of  radius, 
49 curves of  radius, 
46 curves of 110 to  radius, 
59 curves of 150 to  radius, 
42 curves of  radius and upward,

Gravity cars

The railroad became famous for its gravity cars – four-wheeled coasters introduced in 1902 that took advantage of the steep, uninterrupted grade. Gravity cars had an operator known as a gravityman who sat in the front-right seat (on most cars) and operated two brake levers that pressed heavy-duty brake shoes against the car's wheels. Gravitymen had strict orders to obey a 12 mile-per-hour speed limit as they glided down Mt. Tamalpais, either to Muir Woods or into Mill Valley. "Gravities" ran at scheduled times, like all trains on the line, essential to safe operation on a single track railroad. Gravity cars were towed back to the summit by the steam engines, where they were stored in the yard for the next run.

Steam locomotives

Demise
On July 2, 1929, a wind-driven wildfire swept down the slopes of Mount Tamalpais through Blithedale Canyon and came within two blocks of the Mill Valley depot as nearly one hundred homes burned. The last train down the mountain carried sixty-five passengers to safety through the smoke. Snakes sought refuge from adjacent flames on the railway and were crushed under the train wheels, making the rails slippery and requiring liberal use of sand to prevent excessive speed.

Legacy
On May 3, 2009, a small museum opened in the former East Peak yard of the Mt. Tamalpais and Muir Woods Railway. The Gravity Car Barn shelters a recreated gravity car that rolls from the barn on 84 feet of rail. Volunteer docents from the Friends of Mt. Tam staff the museum on weekends. Displays and a short documentary illustrate the railroad's story.

See also 
 Gravity railroad

References

Bibliography

External links
Friends of Mt. Tam.org: Mount Tamalpais and Muir Woods Railway
 Read the Plaque: Gravity Car 

Defunct California railroads
Mount Tamalpais
Mill Valley, California
History of Marin County, California
Transportation in the San Francisco Bay Area
1896 establishments in California
1930 disestablishments in California
Railway companies established in 1896
Railway companies disestablished in 1930